Harpers Bizarre was an American sunshine pop band of the 1960s, best known for their Broadway/sunshine pop sound and their cover of Simon & Garfunkel's "The 59th Street Bridge Song (Feelin' Groovy)."

Career 
Harpers Bizarre was formed out of the Tikis, a band from Santa Cruz, California, which had some local successes with Beatlesque songs in the mid 1960s. The Tikis had been signed to Tom Donahue's Autumn Records from 1965 to 1966 and had released two singles on that label. In 1967, record producer Lenny Waronker got hold of the Simon & Garfunkel song "The 59th Street Bridge Song (Feelin' Groovy)," determined to make it into a hit single. The Tikis recorded it using an arrangement created by Leon Russell, featuring extended harmonies reminiscent of the work of Brian Wilson or even the Swingle Singers. The song was released under a new band name, "Harpers Bizarre" (a play on the magazine Harper's Bazaar), so as not to alienate the Tikis' fanbase. The Harpers Bizarre version of the song reached No. 13 on the US Billboard Hot 100 chart in April 1967, far exceeding any success that the Tikis thus far had. The track reached No. 34 on the UK Singles Chart.

The success of the single prompted Harpers Bizarre to record their debut album. At this point, the band consisted of Ted Templeman (vocals, drums, guitar), Dick Scoppettone (vocals, guitar, bass), Eddie James (guitar), Dick Yount (bass, vocals), and John Petersen (drums, percussion, vocals). Petersen had previously already enjoyed a brief spell of success as member of the Beau Brummels; James left after the release of the group's second album and was replaced by Tom Sowell. Under the guidance of producer Lenny Waronker (and Templeman, who emerged as the leader of the group), Harpers Bizarre developed a unique sound which experimented with heavy vocal layering. Most of Harpers Bizarre's recordings are cheerful and airy, both in subject matter and musical accompaniment, often with string and woodwind arrangements. Their music is most closely associated with the sunshine pop and baroque pop genres.

In addition to covering several old standards (including Cole Porter's "Anything Goes" and Glenn Miller's "Chattanooga Choo Choo"), Harpers Bizarre also recorded the work of several contemporary songwriters, Randy Newman, Van Dyke Parks and Harry Nilsson, who also appear on their recordings in the guise of session musicians and/or arrangers. Neither Randy Newman, Van Dyke Parks, nor Harry Nilsson were ever members of the Tikis or Harpers Bizarre. One of their recordings was the mildly controversial Randy Newman number "The Biggest Night of Her Life", about a schoolgirl who is "too excited to sleep" because she has promised to lose her virginity on her sixteenth birthday to a boy, whom her parents like "because his hair is always neat".

After the band's initial chart ascendancy with "The 59th Street Bridge Song (Feelin' Groovy)", none of Harpers Bizarre's subsequent singles achieved the same level of success. "Chattanooga Choo Choo" did reach No. 1 on Billboard Easy Listening chart, despite a drug reference ("do another number down in Carolina"). The band broke up shortly after their last album was released in 1969. Templeman has stated that they broke up over whether to continue with their producer: "Well, the lowdown was that the rest of the band didn't want Lenny to produce us anymore, but I did. So, it was me against them. (Laughs) And that was it."

In 1967, they contributed the title song for the short-lived ABC-TV series Malibu U, starring Ricky Nelson. Their music can also be heard in the 1968 film I Love You, Alice B. Toklas.

On October 31, 1969, while returning to San Francisco after playing a concert in Pasadena, California, the group's TWA flight was hijacked. All the passengers were safely released in Denver, Colorado. However, the plane and its crew continued on to Rome, Italy, where the hijacker was apprehended. This incident covered 6,900 miles, the longest distance ever covered in an airplane hijacking incident. Scoppettone later described the hijack as "the best publicity we ever had, by a mile".

Also in 1969, they were guests on NBC's The Spring Thing, a musical television special hosted by Bobbie Gentry and Noel Harrison. Other guests included were Goldie Hawn, Meredith MacRae, Irwin C. Watson, Rod McKuen, and Shirley Bassey.

Their rendition of "Anything Goes" is heard over the opening scenes of the 1970 film The Boys in the Band and in the film's trailer.

Ted Templeman went on to become a prominent music producer for several established artists, including Van Morrison, Bette Midler, and Carly Simon, and help launch the careers of a number of new artists, like The Doobie Brothers, Nicolette Larson, Montrose, and Van Halen. 

In 1976, a partial reunion of the group occurred (without Templeman) to record an album, As Time Goes By, which is often overlooked in Harpers Bizarre discographies.

Drummer John Petersen, husband of Templeman's sister Roberta, died suddenly on November 11, 2007 of a heart attack. Dick Yount died in March 2019.

Discography

Albums
Feelin' Groovy (Warner Bros., 1967)
Anything Goes (Warner Bros., 1967)
The Secret Life of Harpers Bizarre (Warner Bros., 1968)
Harpers Bizarre 4 (Warner Bros., 1969)
As Time Goes By (Forest Bay, 1976)
Feelin' Groovy: The Best of Harpers Bizarre (Warner Archives, 1997)
The Complete Singles Collection (1965-1970) (Now Sounds, 2016)

The Big Beat Records compilation albums Dance with Me: The Autumn Teen Sound (1994) and Someone to Love: The Birth of the San Francisco Sound (1996) contain the Tikis' two 45s and several previously unreleased recordings.

Singles

References

Further reading

American pop rock music groups
Hijacking survivors
Musical groups established in 1967
Musical groups from California
Sunshine pop
Warner Records artists